Alan Alexander (born 1 November 1941) is a Scottish former professional footballer who played as a goalkeeper in the Football League for Bradford (Park Avenue).

References

1941 births
Living people
Scottish footballers
Association football goalkeepers
Bradford (Park Avenue) A.F.C. players
Corby Town F.C. players
People from Cumbernauld
English Football League players
Footballers from North Lanarkshire